The CFA franc (Franc of the Financial Community of Africa, originally Franc of the French Colonies in Africa, or colloquially ; abbreviation: F.CFA) is the name of two currencies, the West African CFA franc, used in eight West African countries, and the Central African CFA franc, used in six Central African countries. Although separate, the two CFA franc currencies have always been at parity and are effectively interchangeable. The ISO currency codes are XAF for the Central African CFA franc and XOF for the West African CFA franc. On 22 December 2019, it was announced that the West African currency would be reformed and replaced by an independent currency to be called Eco.

Both CFA francs have a fixed exchange rate to the euro:  €1 = F.CFA 655.957 exactly.

Usage
CFA francs are used in fourteen countries: twelve nations formerly ruled by France in West and Central Africa (excluding Guinea and Mauritania, which withdrew), plus Guinea-Bissau (a former Portuguese colony), and Equatorial Guinea (a former Spanish colony). These fourteen countries have a combined population of 193.1 million people (as of 2021), and a combined GDP of US$283.0 billion (as of 2021).

Evaluation
The currency has been criticized for making economic planning for the developing countries of French West Africa all but impossible since the CFA's value is pegged to the euro (whose monetary policy is set by the European Central Bank). Others disagree and argue that the CFA "helps stabilize the national currencies of Franc Zone member-countries and greatly facilitates the flow of exports and imports between France and the member-countries". The European Union's own assessment of the CFA's link to the euro, carried out in 2008, noted that "benefits from economic integration within each of the two monetary unions of the CFA franc zone, and even more so between them, remained remarkably low" but that "the peg to the French franc and, since 1999, to the euro as exchange rate anchor is usually found to have had favourable effects in the region in terms of macroeconomic stability".

Name
Since independence, CFA is taken to mean  (African Financial Community), but in actual use, the term can have two meanings (see Institutions below).

History

Creation
The CFA franc was created on 26 December 1945, along with the CFP franc. The reason for their creation was the weakness of the French franc immediately after World War II. When France ratified the Bretton Woods Agreement in December 1945, the French franc was devalued in order to set a fixed exchange rate with the US dollar. New currencies were created in the French colonies to spare them the strong devaluation, thereby making it easier for them to import goods from France (and simultaneously making it harder for them to export goods to France). French officials presented the decision as an act of generosity. René Pleven, the French Minister of Finance, was quoted as saying:

Exchange rate
The CFA franc was created with a fixed exchange rate versus the French franc. This exchange rate was changed only twice, in 1948 and in 1994 (besides nominal adaptation to the new French franc in 1960 and the Euro in 1999).

Exchange rate:
 26 December 1945 to 16 October 1948 – F.CFA 1 = 1.70 French franc. This 70 centime premium is the consequence of the creation of the CFA franc, which spared the French African colonies the devaluation of December 1945 (before December 1945, 1 local franc in these colonies was worth 1 French franc).

 17 October 1948 to 31 December 1959 – F.CFA 1 = 2 French francs (the CFA franc had followed the French franc's devaluation versus the US dollar in January 1948, but on 18 October 1948, the French franc devalued again and this time the CFA franc was revalued against the French franc to offset almost all of this new devaluation of the French franc; after October 1948, the CFA followed all the successive devaluations of the French franc)

 1 January 1960 to 11 January 1994– F.CFA 1 = NF 0.02 (1 January 1960: the French franc redenominated, with 100 old francs becoming 1 new franc)

 12 January 1994 to 31 December 1998– F.CFA 1 = F 0.01. An overnight 50% devaluation.

 1 January 1999 onwards – F.CFA 100 = €0.152449 or €1 euro = F.CFA 655.957. (1 January 1999:  the euro replaced FRF at the rate of 6.55957 FRF for 1 euro)

The 1960 and 1999 events merely reflect changes of currency in use in France: the actual relative value of the CFA franc versus the French franc/euro only changed in 1948 and 1994.

Changes in countries using the franc
Over time, the number of countries and territories using the CFA franc has changed as some countries began introducing their own separate currencies. A couple of nations in West Africa have also chosen to adopt the CFA franc since its introduction, despite the fact that they had never been French colonies.

 1960: Guinea leaves and begins issuing Guinean francs.
 1962: Mali leaves and begins issuing Malian francs.
 1973: Madagascar leaves (in 1972, according to another source) and begins issuing its own francs, the Malagasy franc, which ran concurrently with the Malagasy ariary (1 ariary = 5 Malagasy francs).
 1973: Mauritania leaves, replacing the franc with the Mauritanian ouguiya (1 ouguiya = 5 CFA francs).
 1974: Saint-Pierre and Miquelon leaves for French franc, which changed later to the Euro
 1975: Réunion leaves for French franc, which changed later to the Euro
 1976: Mayotte leaves for French franc, which changed later to the Euro
 1984: Mali rejoins (1 CFA franc = 2 Malian francs).
 1985: Equatorial Guinea joins (1 franc = 4 bipkwele)
 1997: Guinea-Bissau joins (1 franc = 65 pesos)

European Monetary Union
In 1998, in anticipation of Economic and Monetary Union of the European Union, the Council of the European Union addressed the monetary agreements France had with the CFA Zone and Comoros and ruled that:
 The agreements are unlikely to have any material effect on the monetary and exchange rate policy of the Eurozone
 In their present forms and states of implementation, the agreements are unlikely to present any obstacle to a smooth functioning of economic and monetary union
 Nothing in the agreements can be construed as implying an obligation for the European Central Bank (ECB) or any national central bank to support the convertibility of the CFA and Comorian francs
 Modifications to the existing agreements will not lead to any obligations for the European Central or any national central bank
 The French Treasury will guarantee the free convertibility at a fixed parity between the euro and the CFA and Comorian francs
 The competent French authorities shall keep the European Commission, the European Central Bank and the Economic and Financial Committee informed about the implementation of the agreements and inform the Committee prior to changes of the parity between the euro and the CFA and Comorian francs
 Any change to the nature or scope of the agreements would require Council approval on the basis of a Commission recommendation and ECB consultation

Criticism and replacement in West Africa 
Critics point out that the currency is controlled by the French treasury, and in turn African countries channel more money to France than they receive in aid and have no sovereignty over their monetary policies. In January 2019, Italian ministers accused France of impoverishing Africa through the CFA franc. However, criticism of the CFA franc, coming from various African organizations, continued. On 21 December 2019, President Alassane Ouattara of the Ivory Coast and President Emmanuel Macron of France announced an initiative to replace the West African CFA Franc with the Eco. Subsequently, a reform of the West African CFA franc was initiated. In May 2020, the French National Assembly agreed to end the French engagement in the West African CFA franc. The countries using the currency will no longer have to deposit half of their foreign exchange reserves with the French Treasury. The West African CFA franc is expected to be renamed to the "Eco" in the near future.

The broader Economic Community of West African States (ECOWAS), of which the members of UEMOA are also members, plans to introduce its own common currency for its member states by 2027, which they have also formally adopted the name of eco for.

Institutions
There are two different currencies called the CFA franc: the West African CFA franc (ISO 4217 currency code XOF), and the Central Africa CFA franc (ISO 4217 currency code XAF). They are distinguished in French by the meaning of the abbreviation CFA. These two CFA francs have the same exchange rate with the euro (1 euro = 655.957 XOF = 655.957 XAF), and they are both guaranteed by the French treasury, but the West African CFA franc cannot be used in Central African countries, and the Central Africa CFA franc cannot be used in West African countries.

West African

It is issued by the BCEAO (i.e., "Central Bank of the West African States"), located in Dakar, Senegal, for the eight countries of the UEMOA (i.e., "West African Economic and Monetary Union"):

 
 

 
 
 
 

These eight countries have a combined population of 134.7 million people (as of 2021), and a combined GDP of US$179.7 billion (as of 2021).

Central African

It is issued by the BEAC (i.e., "Bank of the Central African States"), located in Yaoundé, Cameroon, for the six countries of the CEMAC (i.e., "Economic and Monetary Community of Central Africa"):

These six countries have a combined population of 58.4 million people (as of 2021), and a combined GDP of US$103.3 billion (as of 2021).

In 1975, Central African CFA banknotes were issued with an obverse unique to each participating country, and common reverse, in a fashion similar to euro coins.

Equatorial Guinea, the only former Spanish colony in the zone, adopted the CFA in 1984.

Gallery

See also

Comorian franc
Currencies related to the euro
CFP franc
Réunion franc

References

External links

History of the CFA franc
Franc zone information at Banque de France 
 (in French, but more extensive than the English version)
Decision of the Council of Europe on 23 November 1998 regarding the CFA and Comorian francs
"For better or worse: the euro and the CFA franc", Africa Recovery, Department of Public Information, United Nations (April 1999)

Other
Central Bank of Madagascar 

The CFA franc zone and the EMU
Aubin Nzaou-Kongo, International Law and Monetary Sovereignty, African Review of Law, 2020

Economy of Benin
Economy of Chad
Currencies introduced in 1945
Fixed exchange rate
French West Africa
Currencies of Cameroon